Thelaira solivaga is a species of fly in the family Tachinidae.

References

Diptera of Europe
Taxa named by Moses Harris
Dexiinae
Insects described in 1780